27 km may refer to:
, a rural locality (a crossing) in Orenburg Oblast, Russia
27 km Zheleznoy Dorogi Monchegorsk–Olenya, a rural locality in Murmansk Oblast, Russia